The 1936–37 season was the 28th in the history of the Isthmian League, an English football competition.

Kingstonian were champions, winning their second Isthmian League title.

League table

References

Isthmian League seasons
I